The souimanga sunbird (Cinnyris sovimanga) is a small passerine bird of the sunbird family, Nectariniidae. It is native to the islands of the western Indian Ocean where it occurs on Madagascar, the Aldabra Group and the Glorioso Islands.

Description
The black bill is long, thin and curved. Males of the nominate subspecies have a metallic green head, back and throat. The breast is blackish with a more or less continuous red band while the belly is yellow and the wings and tail are brown. There are yellow tufts at the sides of the breast which become visible when the birds lift their wings in courtship display. Males presumably moult into a duller eclipse plumage by March–April, losing most of the metallic and red feathering for a few months. Females have grey-brown upperparts, a dull yellow belly and a grey throat and breast with darker markings. Juveniles are similar to the adult females but the chin and throat are sometimes black and the upperparts may be more olive.

The males have a broader red breastband and there is no yellow on the underparts which are dark brown (ssp. abbotti) or blackish (ssp. buchenorum).

Females measure 10% less.

This bird has a chirruping flight call and a loud, hoarse alarm call. Only the male sings; a fast and scratchy song with frequently repeated phrases.

Taxonomy
There are five subspecies. The nominate subspecies C. s. sovimanga is found across most of Madagascar and on the Glorioso Islands. In south-western Madagascar it is replaced by C. s. apolis with C. s. aldabrensis on Aldabra atoll, C. s. abbotti on Assumption Island and C. s. buchenorum on Cosmoledo and Astove. The forms abbotti and buchenorum are sometimes considered to be a separate species, Abbott's sunbird, and would then be called Cinnyris abbotti.

This sunbird is one of those separated from the former catch-all genus Nectarinia in Cinnyris.

Ecology
Together with the Malagasy white-eye and the Madagascar cisticola, souimanga sunbirds are the most common small landbirds across much of their range; ample stocks of the present species and the white-eye exist in the maybe  of habitat in the Glorioso Islands. The IUCN considers it a species of least concern.

The souimanga sunbird can be found in a variety of habitats from mountain forests to mangroves and scrubland as well as in parks, gardens and other human-modified ecosystems. They use their curved bill to probe flowers for nectar and also feed on insects and spiders. They have few natural enemies and their nests are inaccessible to most predators.

Reproduction
The long breeding season lasts from August to March on Aldabra at least. The nest is dome-shaped and has an entrance hole on the side. It is made of plant material such as grass stems, coconut fibre and leaves. Two eggs are laid and are incubated for 13 to 14 days; they are whitish with reddish mottling. The young birds fledge after 16 to 18 days. Nest-building and incubation of the eggs are done by the female who also plays a greater role than the male in feeding the chicks.

Gallery

Footnotes

References
 
 
 Penny, Malcolm (1974): The Birds of Seychelles and the Outlying Islands. Collins, London. .
 Peterson, Alan P. (2002): Zoonomen Nomenclatural data. Accessed 15 May 2008.
 Rocamora, Gérard; Feare, Chris J.; Skerrett, Adrian; Athanase, Majella & Greig, Edwina (2003): The breeding avifauna of Cosmoledo Atoll (Seychelles) with special reference to seabirds: conservation status and international importance. Bird Conservation International 13: 151–174.  (HTML abstract)
 Sinclair, Ian & Langrand, Olivier (2003): Birds of the Indian Ocean Islands. Struik, Cape Town.
 Skerrett, Adrian; Bullock, Ian & Disley, Tony (2001): Birds of Seychelles. Princeton University Press, Princeton, NJ. .

souimanga sunbird
Birds of Madagascar
Birds of Seychelles
souimanga sunbird
souimanga sunbird